Kakamega County is a county in the former Western Province of Kenya and borders Vihiga County to the South, Siaya County to the West, Bungoma and Trans Nzoia counties to the North and Nandi and Uasin Gishu counties to the East. Its capital and largest town is Kakamega. It has a population of 1,867,579 and an area of 3,033.8 km2.

Physical and topical features 
County has an altitude range from 1,240 metres to 2,000 metres above sea level. Southern part of the county is hilly and made of granites which raises it 1950m above sea level. Nandi Escarpment is a key feature on the eastern border of the county with steep cliffs rising from 1700m to 2000m. The county is also endowed with a number of hills like Misango, Imanga, Eregi, Butieri, Sikhokhochole, Mawe Tatu, Lirhanda, Kiming’ini hills among others.

Climatic conditions 
Rainfall is uniformly distributed throughout the year with march and July receiving highest whereas December and February the least.

The county has annual rainfall that range from 1280.1 mm to 2214.1 mm per year. The temperature range is 18 °C to 29 °C with the hottest months being are January, February, March and on the others side July and August being the coldest.

Demographics 
As per 2019 census Kakamega county had a total population of 1,867,579 people, of which 897,133 are males, 970,406 being females and 40 intersex persons. There are 433,207 households with an average size of 4.3 persons per household and a population density of 618 people per square kilometer.

Administrative and political units

Administrative units 
Administration wise, the county is divided into twelve sub counties, sixty county assembly wards, eighty three locations, two hundred and fifty sub-locations, one hundred eighty seven Village Units and four hundred Community Administrative Areas. Politically, it comprises twelve constituencies and sixty wards.

Constituencies 

The county has twelve constituencies (2013): 
Lugari Constituency
Likuyani Constituency
Malava Constituency
Lurambi Constituency
Navakholo Constituency
Mumias West Constituency
Mumias East Constituency
Matungu Constituency 
Butere Constituency
Khwisero Constituency 
Shinyalu Constituency
Ikolomani Constituency

The Mumias Constituency was divided into Mumias West and Mumias East.

Political leadership 
The governor is Fernandes Barasa and is deputised by [Philip Museve Kutima]]. He has been governor since 2013 and serving his second and final term in office that ends in 2022. Cleophas Malalah is the senator and joined office in 2017 after defeating the Seth Panyako.Elsie Busihile Muhanda is the women representative and joined the office in 2017 after defeating Rachel Amamo who was the first elected women representative 2013–2017.

For Kakamega County, the County Executive Committee comprises:-

Source

Education 
There are 1631 ECD centres 1136 primary schools and 408 secondary schools. The county has also 4 teachers training colleges, 51 Youth Polytechnics, 3 technical training institutes, 6 university campuses and 1 university as at 2014.

Source

Health 

Kakamega has one county referral hospital (Kakamega County General Teaching & Referral Hospital), 12 sub-county hospitals, 47 health centres, 123 dispensaries and 44 clinics. Both private and public health facilities hold a total bed capacity of 3,949 with public sector having 2,338 beds and private hospitals 197 beds and mission/NGO is 1,414 beds capacity.

HIV prevalence in Kakamega County is 4.0% lower than the national one that is at 5.9%.

 FBO – Faith Based Organizations

Trade and commerce 
There are 62 trading centres, 11,083 retail traders, 21 supermarkets, 203 wholesale traders and 1180 registered hotels.

Agriculture 
Agriculture is the backbone of the county with it producing over 65 percent of the total earnings.

There are two main categories of crops food crops and industrial crops and the last category being horticulture. Food crops include maize, sorghum, finger millet, rice, beans, peas, grams, cassava, s/potato, and arrowroots.

Transport and communication 
The county is covered by 4,451.3 km of road network. of this 1,308.90 km is covered by earth surface, 2,792.25 is covered by gravel, 939.32 km is murram surface and 307.5 km is covered by bitumen.

There are 14 Post Offices with 8,400 installed letter boxes, 6,969 rented letter boxes and 1,431 vacant letter boxes.

Services and urbanisation
 Source: USAid Kenya

Villages and settlements
Butsotso
Emasatsi
Ivakale
Kilingili
Kiming'ini
Masati
Mureko
Nanyeni
Eregi

References

 
Counties of Kenya